Museum Store Company is an online retailer headquartered in Denver, Colorado, United States. It is an American company that sells reproductions of museum objects. The company was established as an online retailer in 1997.

Business model
Museum Store Company is one of the largest specialty retailers in the Museum and Historic Replica market. Museum Store Company.com was founded in 1997 under the TheArtifact.

MuseumStoreCompany.com also functions as a marketplace for related merchandise under the brand Museum Stores Incorporated or Museum Stores Inc.(tm)

In popular culture
 In January 2008, Museum Store Company outfitted a room for the ABC television series Extreme Makeover Home Edition.
 In 2007, USA Today showcased the MuseumStoreCompany's items in their article Decorating with Science.

This site's products were featured in the Universal movie, "Catwoman," and were used as featured accents in the TV show Extreme Makeover Home Edition.  The site also provided products to Lotte World in Seoul, Korea for their Egyptian Exhibit. Several Egyptian products will be featured in the upcoming Warner Brothers movie "The Watchman."

References

External links
 Official website

Retail companies established in 1997
Companies based in Denver
Museum companies